Tetrabutyltin is the organotin compound with the molecular formula  or , where Bu is butyl . Sometimes abbreviated TTBT, it is a colorless, lipophilic oil.

Tetrabutyltin is a precursor to tributyltin and dibutyltin compounds. By the redistribution reaction with tin(IV) chloride it forms tributyltin chloride and dibutyltin chloride. These compounds are starting materials for a wide range of organotin compounds used as stabilizers for PVC and as biocides, fungicides, wood preservatives, and (historically) marine anti-biofouling agents.

References

Organotin compounds
Tin(IV) compounds
Butyl compounds